Erin Gray (born January 7, 1950) is an American model, casting agent, and actress whose roles include Colonel Wilma Deering in the science fiction television series Buck Rogers in the 25th Century and Kate Summers-Stratton in the situation comedy Silver Spoons.

Early life
Gray was born on January 7, 1950, in Honolulu, Territory of Hawaii (now state of Hawaii), the daughter of Diane and Daniel Gray. When Gray was eight, her parents separated. Gray lived with her grandparents in Palm Springs, California for a few years. Eventually she and her mother moved to Larkspur, California. 

Gray attended Redwood High School and finished her last semester at Pacific Palisades High School. She briefly attended college at UCLA, majoring in mathematics, but she left school to pursue a career in modeling and moved to New York.

Career
Gray started her career in modelling. She entered her first contest and won a modelling assignment in St. Louis when she was 14 years old. Commercials followed in Los Angeles. She also appeared on television in 1967 as a dancer in Malibu U. However, she decided to move to New York City to further her modeling career. "By 1975, Gray was one of the nation's top TV models, earning $100,000 a year." Having developed an interest in acting, she auditioned for parts during her frequent trips to Los Angeles.

In 1978, she landed her first starring role, on the miniseries Evening in Byzantium. Following good notices, Gray was put on a seven-year contract at Universal Studios, which led directly to her taking the role of Colonel Wilma Deering in Buck Rogers in the 25th Century, at first for a theatrically released movie, then for a weekly TV series. Gray's trim, shapely figure, augmented by a tight, one-piece Spandex jumpsuit uniform, was popular with the show's predominantly young male audience.

Gray was aware of the sexiness of her tight uniform. Her character, the female lead, also had a high profile in the show, second only to Gil Gerard in the starring role and representing an early example of a strong female character in a science fiction setting. Gray was thus seen as an important role model for female viewers, as she explained to an interviewer:

Shortly after Buck Rogers, Gray appeared in the first season Magnum, P.I. episode, "J. 'Digger' Doyle", in which she played security expert Joy 'Digger' Doyle. The role was intended to become recurring, and even possibly spun off into a separate series, but neither happened, and it remained the character's only appearance in the series. In 1982, Gray played the role of Lilah in the summer feature film Six Pack as Kenny Rogers' love interest. Gray's role as Kate Summers in the TV sitcom Silver Spoons lasted for several years in the 1980s. When that show ended, she took regular film and TV work; she appeared in an episode of Superboy and Murder, She Wrote. In 1993, Gray had a featured role in Jason Goes to Hell: The Final Friday, the ninth entry in the Friday the 13th series. She also appeared in the 2005 film Siren.

In 2010, Gray and Gil Gerard returned to Buck Rogers by playing the characters' parents in the pilot episode of the Buck Rogers web series. Among her work in commercials was a 2010 spot for Pup-Peroni dog treats.

Gray is now a casting agent whose agency, Heroes for Hire, specializes in booking sci-fi and fantasy stars for personal appearances, speaking engagements, and charity events. Gray also teaches T'ai chi.

In 1998, Gray wrote a book, Act Right, with Mara Purl which contains advice for novice television and movie actors. A revised edition was published in 2002.

Gray starred in the 2011 film Dreams Awake (with Alien Nation co-star Gary Graham). She also played the role of Madeline Twain on the web series The Guild.

Gray guest-starred in the 2014 webisode "Lolani" from the web series Star Trek Continues as Commodore Gray, an episode that also starred Lou Ferrigno. Commodore Gray reappears in 2016, with the seventh episode "Embracing the Winds."

Personal life
Gray has been married twice. She met Ken Schwartz in high school and their marriage lasted from 1968 to 1990, during which they had one son, Kevan Ray Schwartz, born in 1976. Ken Schwartz, a successful real estate executive, remained in New York with their young son when Gray first started working on Buck Rogers, and eventually moved to Los Angeles to work as her manager when her acting career flourished.

Gray married Richard Hissong in 1991, and their daughter Samantha was born the same year. Samantha plays Buck Rogers' girlfriend, Maddy, in the pilot episode of James Cawley's Buck Rogers Internet video series.

Filmography

Movies

Television

Video game

References

External links

1950 births
Living people
20th-century American actresses
21st-century American actresses
Actresses from Honolulu
American film actresses
American soap opera actresses
American television actresses
Female models from Hawaii
University of California, Los Angeles alumni
Redwood High School (Larkspur, California) alumni